Phenacolepas galathea is a species of sea snail, a marine gastropod mollusk in the family Phenacolepadidae.

Description

Distribution

References

Phenacolepadidae